UDPD may refer to:

Upper Dublin Police Department (Pennsylvania)
University of Delaware Police